Guido "Totti" Landert (born November 3, 1985, in Wattwil) is a Swiss ski jumper who competed from 2005 to 2008. At the 2006 Winter Olympics in Turin, he finished seventh in the team large hill, 37th in the individual large hill, and 48th in the individual normal hill events.

Landert competed at the 2007 FIS Nordic World Ski Championships in Sapporo, finishing seventh in the team large hill, 40th in the individual large hill, and 49th in the individual normal hills events. His best finishes at the Ski flying World Championships was sixth in the team event in 2006 and 23rd in the individual event in 2008.

He retired following the 2007-08 World Cup season.

References
FIS Newsflash 177 article on Landert's retirement. April 30, 2008.
FIS-Ski profile

1985 births
Living people
Ski jumpers at the 2006 Winter Olympics
Swiss male ski jumpers
Olympic ski jumpers of Switzerland